The 2021 Canadian Tire National Skating Championships were scheduled be held on February 8–14, 2021 at the Doug Mitchell Thunderbird Sports Centre in Vancouver, British Columbia. Medals were to be awarded in the disciplines of men's singles, women's singles, pair skating, and ice dance on the senior and junior levels. Although the official International Skating Union terminology for female skaters in the singles category is ladies, Skate Canada uses women officially.  The results were supposed to be part of the Canadian selection criteria for the 2021 World Championships. (The other three ISU Championship events (the 2021 Four Continents Championships, and the 2021 World Junior Championships) were cancelled.)

Vancouver was announced as the host in January 2020. The city has hosted the event six times previously. Competitors qualified at the Skate Canada Challenge in January.

The competition was officially cancelled on January 11.

Impact of the COVID-19 pandemic 
The competition was originally scheduled for January 11–17, 2021, but was postponed in October 2020. No novice events were held. The Skate Canada Challenge, normally held in December and the main qualifier for Nationals, was postponed and held virtually. The number of competitors in each discipline was also reduced. The competition was officially cancelled on January 11, due to unpredictable travel restrictions and rink closures.

Entries 
The top two flights (12 in singles, 8 in pairs, and 10 in ice dance) in each discipline at the 2021 Skate Canada Challenge qualified to Nationals.

Senior

Junior

International team selections

World Championships 
The World Championships were held from March 22–28 in Stockholm, Sweden.

Four Continents Championships 
The 2021 Four Continents Championships, to be held from February 9–14 in Sydney, Australia, were cancelled.

World Junior Championships 

The 2021 World Junior Championships were scheduled from March 1–7 in Harbin, China, but were cancelled on November 24.

World Team Trophy 
The World Team Trophy was held from April 15–18 in Osaka, Japan.

References

External links
 

Canadian Figure Skating Championships
Figure skating
Canadian Figure Skating Championships
Canadian Figure Skating Championships
Canadian Figure Skating Championships